The 89th Medium Tank Battalion was an armored tank unit of the United States Army. It was activated in Korea in August 1950 and in November 1951, it was assigned to the 25th Infantry Division. And supported the Eighth Army Ranger Company during Battle of the Ch'ongch'on River. The unit participated in no fewer than ten campaigns, from 1951 through the Armistice in 1953 with the 25th Infantry Division. It earned the Presidential Unit Citation and the Navy Unit Commendation.

The 89th Tank Battalion returned to Hawaii with the 25th Infantry Division where it remained until inactivation in 1957.

References
 Official Site of the 25th Infantry Division 
  25th Infantry Division Association
 69th Armored Regiment Unit History
 Army Special Forces History

External links 
 89th Medium Tank Battalion

Tank battalions of the United States Army
Military units and formations established in 1950
Military units and formations disestablished in 1957